The 1964 Vermont gubernatorial election took place on November 3, 1964. Incumbent Democrat Philip H. Hoff ran successfully for re-election to a second term as Governor of Vermont, defeating Republican candidate Ralph A. Foote.

Democratic primary

Results

Republican primary

Results

General election

Results

References

Vermont
1964
Gubernatorial
November 1964 events in the United States